Djibril Sall (born 6 April 1961) is a Senegalese judoka. He competed in the men's extra-lightweight event at the 1984 Summer Olympics.

References

External links
 

1961 births
Living people
Senegalese male judoka
Olympic judoka of Senegal
Judoka at the 1984 Summer Olympics
Place of birth missing (living people)
20th-century Senegalese people
21st-century Senegalese people